Robert 'Bobby' Yule was a Scottish football wing forward who began his career in Scotland before moving to the American Soccer League where he played for eight years.

In 1919, Yule signed with Aberdeen F.C. in the Scottish League. He saw time in only 27 games before leaving Scotland in 1922. He may have spent a year in Fore River. In 1923, he signed with the Brooklyn Wanderers in the American Soccer League. In 1930, he moved to the New York Giants then the Fall River and ended his career with the New York Yankees.

References

Aberdeen F.C. players
Scottish footballers
Scottish expatriate footballers
American Soccer League (1921–1933) players
Brooklyn Wanderers players
Fall River F.C. players
New York Yankees (soccer) players
New York Giants (soccer, 1930–1932) players
Scottish Football League players
Year of birth missing
Year of death missing
Association football forwards
Scottish expatriate sportspeople in the United States
Expatriate soccer players in the United States